Flávio Basso (26 January 1968 – 21 December 2015), better known by his stage name Júpiter Maçã and by its English-language variation Jupiter Apple, was a Brazilian singer, songwriter, multi-instrumentalist and filmmaker. Before beginning a solo career in 1994, he was already known for being a founding member of bands TNT and Os Cascavelletes, both pioneers of the Rio Grande do Sul rock scene in the mid-to-late 1980s/early 1990s.

Biography

Early years, TNT and Os Cascavelletes 
Flávio Basso was born in Porto Alegre, Rio Grande do Sul on 26 January 1968; his father was a physicist and his mother a teacher of German descent. He learned by himself to play the classical guitar when he was 13 years old, and cites Paul McCartney, Syd Barrett, John Lennon, Bob Dylan, Mick Jagger and Brian Jones as some of his influences. In 1984 he formed the rockabilly band TNT alongside his childhood friends Márcio Petracco, Felipe Jotz and Charles Master, being later joined by Nei Van Soria. TNT reached nationwide notoriety after their songs "Entra Nessa" and "Estou na Mão" were included in the 1985 compilation Rock Grande do Sul, made to promote rock bands from Rio Grande do Sul (such as Engenheiros do Hawaii, Os Replicantes, DeFalla and Garotos da Rua) and released by RCA Records. In 1986, one year before TNT released their first studio album, Van Soria and Basso left the band due to creative divergences with RCA to form their own project, Os Cascavelletes, which, despite its relatively short lifespan, managed to release one EP, one studio album and a demo. They self-described their irreverent style, characterized by comical and heavily sexually explicit lyrics, as "porno rock". The band's most famous composition was the 1989 hit "Nêga Bombom", featured in the soundtrack of the telenovela Top Model.

Os Cascavelletes broke up in 1992. In 1993 Basso re-joined TNT to record the single "Você Me Deixa Insano/Tá na Lona", but definitely left them again the following year after a falling-out with Charles Master.

Solo career 
After his second departure from TNT, Basso began to perform solo, under the moniker "Woody Apple" (as an homage to musician Woody Guthrie and record label Apple Records, founded by The Beatles). It wasn't until 1995 when he adopted the stage name he became famous for, Júpiter Maçã (with "Júpiter" being an allusion to the fictional spaceship Jupiter 2, from one of his favorite TV series growing up, Lost in Space), and formed the very short-lived project Os Pereiras Azuiz alongside Ubirajara Guimarães, Rogério Campos and Luiz Wilfrido; they only released a demo tape, Orgasmo Legal, before disbanding. In 1997 he signed with independent label Antídoto to release his first solo full-length album, A Sétima Efervescência, which counted with guest appearances by his former Os Cascavelletes bandmates Frank Jorge and Alexandre Barea, and by Graforreia Xilarmônica guitarist Marcelo Birck; with a heavily psychedelic and experimental sonority comparable to Pink Floyd's 1967 debut The Piper at the Gates of Dawn, the album was critically acclaimed at the time of its release and in 2007 was ranked 96th at Rolling Stone Brasils list of 100 Greatest Brazilian Music Records. Its follow-up from 1999, Plastic Soda, came out through Trama, and unlike its predecessor, it was fully sung in English; to reflect this, Basso signed the album as Jupiter Apple. It was characterized by an increase in the experimental elements already present in A Sétima Efervescência, mixing psychedelic rock with bossa nova and jazz. Even though it also had a good reception, critics considered it a very hard album to listen to. After the album's release Basso temporarily moved to England, returning to Brazil in 2002.

Hisscivilization, his third album, was released soon afterwards by Voiceprint Records, and was his most ambitious and elaborate work; it is composed of 13 mostly instrumental tracks, the longest of which opens the album and is over 11 minutes long. Basso experimented more with electronic music elements in this album, what polarized critics and fans alike. In 2003 he moved to Europe once again – this time to Spain – alongside his then-domestic partner Bibiana "Bibmo" Morena to work on further material; after a 4-year hiatus, both returned to Brazil and he released alongside her the collaborative album Bitter through Monstro Discos. Through Elefant Records and in the same year he released his fourth (and ultimately last) album, Uma Tarde na Fruteira. It was re-issued in Brazil by Monstro Discos in 2008.
In 2009 he released the non-album single "Modern Kid".

In 2006, six of Basso's songs – "Um Lugar do Caralho", "Querida Superhist x Mr. Frog", "Canção para Dormir", "The Freaking Alice (Hippie Under Groove)", "As Mesmas Coisas" and "A Marchinha Psicótica de Dr. Soup" – were included in the soundtrack of the animated film Wood & Stock: Sexo, Orégano e Rock'n'Roll, directed by Otto Guerra.

On 23 November 2011, Basso performed live at the Bar Opinião in Porto Alegre, accompanied by his newly founded supporting band, J.A.C.K. (an acronym for "Jupiter Apple Corporation and Kingdom"), at the time composed of Julio Sasquatt (drums), Julio Cascaes (electric guitar), Felipe Faraco (bass guitar) and Astronauta Pinguim (keyboards). A DVD of the performance, entitled Six Colours Frenesi, was released in 2014.

On 20 July 2012, he accidentally fell off the second floor of the building where he lived, and fractured one of his wrists and a vertebra. He was then admitted at the Hospital de Pronto Socorro de Porto Alegre, and eventually recovered after a successful surgery.

His final releases were the digital singles "Constantine's Empires" and "They're All Beatniks", which came out through Marquise 51 Records in 2015. The first one is available for listening at the record label's official SoundCloud page.

Alongside Tatá Aeroplano he wrote and directed in 2001 the short film Apartment Jazz, which was broadcast for the first time by MTV in 2010. In 2011 he appeared in "Kreuko", a segment of the anthology film Mundo Invisível, alongside José Wilker and Sônia Braga. In 2015 he began work on a second short, Jane's Nightmare; a trailer was uploaded to YouTube on 15 July, but the film was left unfinished following Basso's death. He also hosted the short-lived talk show Júpiter Maçã Show on MTV.

Basso played his final show on 5 December 2015 at the Panamá Studio Pub, in Porto Alegre.

Death and legacy 
Known for his extravagant lifestyle, Basso struggled with alcoholism and drug abuse (he claimed he took Diazepam and used LSD and cocaine on a regular basis) throughout most of his life, and was undergoing a treatment for cirrhosis on his later years. On 21 December 2015, he was found dead on the bathroom floor in his apartment; his cause of death was later revealed as being multiple organ failure. His wake was held at the Teatro Renascença in Porto Alegre, and he was buried the following day at the Cemitério Ecumênico João XXIII.

Commenting on his death, Basso's former Os Cascavelletes bandmate Frank Jorge said that he was a "tireless creator, a guy who broke away from all commonplaces and predictability". Musician and poet Rogério Skylab has once stated that Basso was one of his major influences, and besides interviewing him for his talk show Matador de Passarinho he has also covered his songs "Na Casa de Mamãe" (for Skygirls), "Eu e Minha Ex" (for Trilogia dos Carnavais: 25 Anos de Carreira ou de Lápide) and "A Marchinha Psicótica de Dr. Soup" (for Crítica da Faculdade do Cu). Former Os Replicantes vocalist Wander Wildner covered "Um Lugar do Caralho" for his 1996 solo debut Baladas Sangrentas. Rock band Ira! covered "Miss Lexotan 6mg Garota" for their 1998 album Você Não Sabe Quem Eu Sou.

Basso's semi-fictional autobiography, A Odisseia: Memórias e Devaneios de Jupiter Apple, co-written by Juli Manzi, was published posthumously by Azougue Editorial in 2016. Work on the book began in 2014; it was reissued in 2022 in a limited deluxe edition by Psico BR. Another biography of the musician, Júpiter Maçã: A Efervescente Vida e Obra, written by journalists Cristiano Bastos and Pedro Brandt, was published on 5 September 2018 by Plus Editora.

On 4 July 2016, Nei Van Soria released a song in tribute to Basso, entitled "Balada para Flávio". He originally wrote the song in November 2015, one month before Basso's death.

As of September 2017, a documentary about Basso, entitled O Garoto de Júpiter, is being made. Directed by Biah Werther and produced by Gabriel Flag, its production was being crowdfunded through website Catarse.

On 29 January 2018, friends of the musician performed a special show in his honor at the Bar Ocidente in Porto Alegre, to celebrate what would have been his 50th birthday on 26 January.

In April 2018 a vinyl deluxe edition of Basso's debut album A Sétima Efervescência came out through Monstro Discos. Monstro Discos announced in November 2018 that a double-vinyl reissue of Uma Tarde na Fruteira was underway; it was released in January 2019.

On 11 March 2021, the posthumous album Apartment Jazz was released, originally intended to serve as the soundtrack of his eponymous film. Later in June, a long out-of-print extended play recorded in 2007 and entitled Ano XXI – № 4 – Incredible News!!!, was re-issued through streaming platforms. A second posthumous album containing nine tracks, The Man Was Jupiter Apple, was released in May 2022.

Discography

With TNT

With Os Cascavelletes 
 For a more comprehensive list, see Os Cascavelletes#Discography

With Os Pereiras Azuiz

Solo

Studio albums

Collaborative album

Video album

Singles

Filmography 
 Apartment Jazz (2001; released in 2010)
 Mundo Invisível (2011; acted only)
 Jane's Nightmare (2015; unfinished)

Bibliography 
 A Odisseia: Memórias e Devaneios de Jupiter Apple (Azougue Editorial, 2016; co-written by Juli Manzi)

References

External links 
 
 

1968 births
2015 deaths
Brazilian rock singers
Brazilian rock musicians
Brazilian rockabilly musicians
Musicians from Rio Grande do Sul
People from Porto Alegre
20th-century Brazilian male singers
20th-century Brazilian singers
Psychedelic rock musicians
Progressive rock musicians
Brazilian classical guitarists
Brazilian male guitarists
Brazilian percussionists
Brazilian keyboardists
Brazilian record producers
Brazilian autobiographers
Brazilian bass guitarists
Brazilian screenwriters
Brazilian film directors
Brazilian male film actors
Brazilian television presenters
Brazilian experimental musicians
21st-century Brazilian male singers
21st-century Brazilian singers
Brazilian people of German descent
21st-century Brazilian male actors
Deaths from multiple organ failure
Male bass guitarists
Brazilian male singer-songwriters
Brazilian people of Italian descent